In Ukraine's history, banknotes denominated in Ukrainian hryvnias (ISO 4217 code: UAH, symbol: ₴) have been issued during two periods. The first of them took place in 1918 and 1919, when the Central Council of Ukraine decided to transition from karbovanets, another currency that circulated in various periods of the country's history, to hryvnia; in practice, the currencies were interchangeable. It became obsolete as the army of the Ukrainian People's Republic lost control over its claimed territory as a result of the defeat in the Ukrainian War of Independence. This article covers all hryvnia banknotes issued, or planned to be issued, by government authorities as well as some local issues. Additionally, shah stamps as subdivisions of hryvnia and interest coupons denominated in hryvnias and shahs are also covered here because they were also printed on paper. The second period when Ukrainian hryvnia banknotes appeared was in the times of post-Soviet independence. In 1991-1996, karbovanets, a successor of the Soviet ruble (also known in Ukrainian as karbovanets), was circulating in the newly independent country, but the currency experienced hyperinflation. First post-independence hryvnia banknotes were printed in Canada and Malta in 1992, but it was only in September 1996 that they entered circulation, following their  by hryvnia at a rate of 100,000:1. All issues of hryvnia banknotes that have been printed in 1994 and later were made in Ukraine.

The National Bank of Ukraine has issued four banknote series since 1996. Currently, all banknotes in denominations of ₴1, ₴2, ₴5, ₴10, ₴20, ₴50, ₴100, ₴200, ₴500 and ₴1,000 issued after 2003 (i.e. of third and fourth series) are considered legal tender. All of them depict an important person in Ukraine's history on the obverse and a landmark place on the reverse. The lowest four denominations are no longer issued in banknotes and are intended to be gradually substituted by coins, though they remain common. There have additionally been four commemorative banknote issues.

Notes issued in Ukraine, including hryvnia notes, can be viewed at the Museum of Money of the National Bank of Ukraine in Kyiv.

Ukrainian War of Independence 
During the later half of 1917, the Central Council of Ukraine sought to gain more autonomy from the Russian Republic, which was ultimately asserted in the Third Universal, establishing the Ukrainian People's Republic (UNR). With the creation of a new state entity, the need of country's own currency became urgent. Thus, in December 1917, UNR introduced karbovanets as a stopgap measure, until hryvnia was installed as an official currency according to the law of 1 March 1918, at an exchange rate of 2 hryvnias to 1 karbovanets emitted in 1917 (i.e. 25 and 50 karbovanets), and defined by law to be convertible to gold at a rate of 1 hryvnia = 8.712 dolya (0.383328 grams, or about 0.0123243 oz t). Hryvnia was additionally subdivided into 100 shah. However, since karbovanets was circulating at par with the Russian ruble/Soviet ruble until late 1918, it could not be worth more than these issues, which were depreciating due to hyperinflation. While legislative efforts to limit or outright ban the usage of Russian currencies in Ukraine were made, they only had limited success. Aggravating the situation was the lack of gold reserves. This meant that hryvnia was also losing value by hundreds of per cent per year, and even though Ukrainian currency was spared from the worst of the hyperinflation, maintaining the gold standard proved unfeasible.

1918

State Credit Notes 
The law of 1 March 1918 envisaged printing denominations of 2, 5, 10, 20, 50, 100, 500 and 1000 hryvnias, which were to be called State Credit Notes. Accordingly, on 24 March 1918, UNR signed an agreement by which banknotes were to be printed by the Reichsdruckerei, the German state banknote printer. There were some problems with the contractor, however. Despite ordering 16,000,000 5-hryvnia notes and 9,000,000 20-hryvnia notes, these were not printed; 50-hryvnia notes were not contracted at all. Additionally, all of the submitted designs of Ukrainian hryvnia banknotes have been tampered with in Germany, changing colours without designers' or government's permission. Heorhiy Narbut, who drew the design of the 500-hryvnia note, has lamented its poor quality of execution. The Ukrainian State decided to forego 5-hryvnia and 20-hryvnia bills in favour of a new denomination of 2,000 hryvnia, which, however, the Ukrainian government was formally not authorised to issue.

All banknotes contain the following text on the reverse: " ~  ~ ", as mandated by law (here referred to as "State Credit Note notice"). Additionally, the gold standard notice was also printed, which read: "(One) hryvnia contains 8.712 dolya of pure gold". All banknotes had anti-counterfeiting protections, such as a watermark and guilloche pattern.

State Treasury Notes 

On 30 March 1918, the Central Council of Ukraine approved a release of 100 million karbovanets worth of State Treasury Notes; the sum was increased to 500 million karbovanets on 12 May, which, in its turn, was doubled on 9 July 1918. While Yakiv Zozulya attributes such rapid increases to the agreement with Austria-Hungary and German Empire, whereby Ukraine granted a 200 million karbovanets "unlimited-term loan" to each of these countries, thus interpreting it as a sign of clientelism, Pavlo Hay-Nyzhnyk said the money was needed to revive the country's economy anyway. 

In essence, State Treasury Notes were 4-year treasury bonds with 3,6% simple interest per annum, paid every six months (on 1 July and 2 January), issued in denominations of 50, 100, 200 and 1,000 hryvnias. They had a unified design prepared by Heorhiy Narbut, with a roughly square centre, where the value of the bond was written, plus four coupons on either side of the note, worth respectively 0.90, 1.80, 3.60 and 18 hryvnias each; the only feature that was different between each of these was colours. Due to the enormous size of the notes, as well as due to the location of coupons, they were nicknamed "airplanes".

The coupons and the notes were not formally intended to be legal tender in the sense that the possibility to redeem them at banks was limited by the dates in coupons, but in practice, due to an acute shortage of small change, these pieces of paper were readily cut out and circulated as plain currency, and Zozulya reports that even government agencies accepted both the notes and the coupons for payments. The coupons and the State Treasury Notes were thus described as "surrogate banknotes".

Shahivky fractional currency 
Unlike State Credit Notes and State Treasury Notes, shahivky (named so after shah, the subdivision of hryvnia, in which the money was denominated) were postage stamp-sized, and indeed they were sometimes used as postage stamps due to the dearth of "real" postage stamps. There was additionally a strong deficit of metals. Therefore, on 18 April 1918, the government authorised to issue paper "coins" of 1, 2, 4, 6, 10, 20, 30, 40 and 50 shahiv. The first four denominations have never been issued nor are known to have ever been printed. According to various estimates, the other five shahivky accounted for about 24-38 million hryvnia in circulation. Among those issued, the 30 shahiv stamp was rarer than the other denominations.

Unlike the postage staps, which were all imperforate, the five pieces of postage stamp currencies were usually ; 40 and 50 shahiv imperforate stamps are known to exist but are much rarer than the perforated versions. Additionally, the currency was printed on thicker paper than the stamps, and the notice saying that the post stamps "circulate alongside metal coinage" appeared on the reverse, unlike in stamps, where the other side was blank. Due to their weak protections, shahivky were often counterfeited, particularly the top two denominations.

Due to their lightness and their propensity to be blown away by the wind, they have earned a tongue-in-cheek nickname of "butterflies", but were also known as "postage stamps" in reference to their size and appearance. The shops of the time were known to be giving out change in bundles of hundreds of such stamp "coins".

Directorate 
Following the fall of the Ukrainian State and the return to the Ukrainian People's Republic, represented by the Directorate, the government tried to shift focus to either of the two concurrent currencies in Ukraine, and finally officially declared hryvnias to be the "national currency". However, many more denominations were issued in karbovanets than in hryvnia in 1919. The government only managed to issue a so-called State Treasury Exchange Note worth 5 hryvnias with a hastily prepared primitive design. It was the only state-sanctioned banknote ever printed on the territory of West Ukrainian People's Republic (ZUNR), or, to be exact, in Stanislaviv (now Ivano-Frankivsk). The banknotes were mostly circulated in eastern Galicia.

Entering 1920, the circulation of the Ukrainian currency started to be curtailed. Already in January 1920, the Communists, who controlled most of Ukraine, ordered the banks to stop accepting all money issued by previous Ukrainian governments, including hryvnias, and removed the obligation to accept Ukrainian currency by private parties, while by the end of the same year, they forbade circulation of all Ukrainian money. It was nevertheless decided to order the last known emission of Ukrainian currency in 1917-1920, i.e. State Credit Notes denominated at 50 and 1,000 hryvnias, which were printed in Vienna. Few proofs of these banknotes are known to exist, and they became obsolete before they could be ever circulated as Petliura dissolved the Directorate's government in November 1920 in light of the lack of control of Ukrainian territories.

Local issues 
Apart from state-issued banknotes, there were also hundreds of local currency paper currency units (notes, coupons etc.) issued by municipal authorities. According to the Encyclopedia of History of Ukraine, over 300 municipalities within current Ukrainian borders issued a total of over 1,500 variously named currency substitutes (mostly rubles, karbovanets and hryvnia). Some of the paper currency denominated in hryvnia is shown in the gallery below.

Post-Soviet Ukraine

History 
As Ukraine was nearing independence in 1991, the government of then Ukrainian SSR began preparations to introduce a new currency named hryvnia. Leonid Kravchuk, then leader of the Supreme Soviet of Ukrainian SSR, ordered in April 1991 to prepare designs for the new national currency. It was initially planned to issue banknotes in denominations of ₴1, ₴3, ₴5, ₴10, ₴25, ₴50, ₴100 and ₴200, mimicking the denominations of the Soviet ruble. The final decision for the design of the currencies was adopted on 11 September 1991. On that day was decided to change planned ₴3 note to ₴2 and ₴25 notes to ₴20, as well as to set aside ₴200 as a reserve denomination. It was also then that the general outline of banknotes was chosen, that is, a prominent person from Ukraine's history on the obverse and a landmark building on the reverse, in most cases directly related with the person displayed. The choice of the people portrayed met with some reservations, as Kravchuk feared that inclusion of Ivan Mazepa on the banknotes might incense Moscow, and the candidacy of Mykhailo Hrushevskyi was also politically sensitive, but it was approved nevertheless, and has remained constant ever since.

The first series was developed by Ukrainian artists Vasyl Lopata and Borys Maksymov, who were notably using relatively uncommon depictions of Taras Shevchenko and the Kievan Rus' rulers. Lopata was drawing the portraits and the buildings, while Maksymov designed the rest of the banknote. Lopata also proposed his versions of 500 and 1,000 hryvnias (with Hryhorii Skovoroda or Daniel of Galicia on the former denomination and Peter Mogila on the latter), but his idea was not supported.

As the preparations for the first series were made, it became apparent that Ukraine was lacking appropriate domestic facilities to print banknotes. Therefore, banknotes of the first series of hryvnias were made by the Canadian Bank Note Company. 50, 100 and 200 hryvnias (which made part of the second series), after some problems connected with print quality and delays with the Canadian contractor, were eventually ordered from the Maltese branch of De La Rue, which was also producing karbovanets banknotes until the  started operation in 1994. However, by the time the banknotes arrived, the economic crisis became so deep and inflation so bad that it was decided to stick with karbovanets. It was only on 2 September 1996 that the first series of hryvnia banknotes (though only up to 20 hryvnias) was introduced into circulation by the National Bank of Ukraine (NBU).

Also in 1996, the 1, 50, and 100 hryvnia notes of the second series were introduced. 1 hryvnia note was already produced in Ukraine in the brand new printing factory (as would all subsequent banknotes), while the two higher denominations were still printed by De La Rue and had better security features in comparison with the first series. Most of other denominations went to circulation the following year. 200 hryvnia note, which was seen at the time as worth too much, was only released in 2001, just before the tenth anniversary of Ukraine's independence.

The second series, however, was quickly found to have several drawbacks, so plans to replace it were approved as early as in 1999. Serhiy Tihipko, then governor of the National Bank of Ukraine, noted that 2, 10 and 20 hryvnias were hardly distinguishable from each other. Artists have also pointed to several design flaws and inaccuracies in the banknotes (Lopata was, for instance, not happy with the De La Rue banknotes), and the National Bank of Ukraine wanted to introduce new security features. Thus in 2003, ₴20 note became the first banknote of the third series of the Ukrainian hryvnia; other denominations quickly followed suit. It was also then that the ₴500 bills, which became among the most common banknotes in Ukraine, were introduced into circulation. 

Refurbished versions of these banknotes, with even more anti-counterfeiting techniques, were released starting from 2014 (₴100), followed by ₴500 regular issue and ₴20 commemorative note in 2016, ₴20 regular bill in 2018 and the rest of the banknotes (including the new ₴1000) in 2019 and early 2020.

Current state 
Since October 2020, all banknotes from the first and the second series are withdrawn from circulation and are only exchanged in banks. In addition to that, banknotes from ₴1 to ₴10 are being substituted by a new set of coins, but, like all the other banknotes of the third series and all banknotes from the fourth series, these still remain legal tender. The banknotes use cotton as a substrate, however, the ₴20 commemorative banknote was the first to use linen fibres. As for regular circulation banknote, the ₴1000 banknote includes 20% linen.

According to the data provided by the NBU, as of 1 July 2021, almost 2,94 billion notes worth more than ₴580 billion are in circulation. Almost a quarter of all banknotes are in ₴200 notes, followed closely by ₴500 notes. ₴1 notes are also relatively common, even as these were initially circulating alongside (big) 1 hryvnia coins and, since 2018, are increasingly substituted by new (smaller) coins. On the other hand, banknotes from ₴2 to ₴20 are relatively rare compared with other denominations, at about 5% of the total quantity of banknotes each.

The detected number of counterfeit hryvnia banknotes was hovering around 3 forged bills per 1 million genuine ones in 2015-2019, which sharply increased to 5.5 counterfeit banknotes per million the following year, which the NBU attributed to the COVID-19 pandemic. The vast majority of forgeries (96%) occurred among the third series banknotes, and the majority of the illicitly produced notes belonged to the two highest denominations of the series.

Regular issues 
All descriptions taken from the site of the National Bank of Ukraine.

First series

Second series

Third series

Fourth series

Commemorative issues

Notes

Sources

References

Books 
 
 
 
 
 
 
 
 

Banknotes of Ukraine